Visakhapatnam Fishing Harbour is a harbour in Visakhapatnam. It opened in 1976 beside Visakhapatnam Port.

The harbour spreads over 26 hectares. It is operated by the Visakhapatnam Port Trust. Its capacity is 700 mechanised boats and 300 beach landing crafts, with an annual turnover of 7,500 crores.

See also

 Visakhapatnam Port

References

External links
 

Ports and harbours of Andhra Pradesh
Bay of Bengal
Fishing in India
Economy of Visakhapatnam
Transport in Visakhapatnam
1976 establishments in Andhra Pradesh